Paul Watkins may refer to:
Paul Watkins (musician) (born 1970), Welsh cellist and conductor
Paul Watkins (novelist) (born 1964), American author
Paul Watkins (Manson Family) (1950–1990), member of Charles Manson's "Family"